Prográmaton is the fifth studio album by the Mexican alternative rock band Zoé. It was released in October 2013 under EMI Music, and was produced by Phil Vinall. A few days before the release of the album on the official website of Zoé were uploaded short of the songs which were unlocked by tweeting a hashtag of the name of the song. His first single was "10 A.M", which included a video. "Arrullo de Estrellas" was the second single and also consists of a video, and the third single was "Fin de Semana".

In 2015, the band re-released the album with additional tracks, as Prográmaton Revisitado Vol. 1.

According to the online archive Setlist.fm, the most often-performed songs from Prográmaton are "10 A.M.", "Arrullo de Estrellas", and "Fin de Semana".

Track listing

Certifications

References

Zoé albums
2013 albums